In the United States, a governor serves as the chief executive and commander-in-chief in each of the fifty states and in the five permanently inhabited territories, functioning as head of state and head of government therein. As such, governors are responsible for implementing state laws and overseeing the operation of the state executive branch. As state leaders, governors advance and pursue new and revised policies and programs using a variety of tools, among them executive orders, executive budgets, and legislative proposals and vetoes. Governors carry out their management and leadership responsibilities and objectives with the support and assistance of department and agency heads, many of whom they are empowered to appoint. A majority of governors have the authority to appoint state court judges as well, in most cases from a list of names submitted by a nominations committee.

All but five states (Arizona, Maine, New Hampshire, Oregon, and Wyoming) have a lieutenant governor. The lieutenant governor succeeds to the gubernatorial office (the powers and duties but not the office, in Massachusetts and West Virginia), if vacated by impeachment, death, or resignation of the previous governor. Lieutenant governors also serve as unofficial acting state governors in case the incumbent governors are unable to fulfill their duties, and they often serve as presiding officers of the upper houses of state legislatures. But in such cases, they cannot participate in political debates, and they have no vote whenever these houses are not equally divided.

Role and powers
States are semi-sovereign republics sharing sovereignty with the federal government of the United States, and possess a number of powers and rights under the United States Constitution, such as regulating intrastate commerce, holding elections, creating local governments, and ratifying constitutional amendments. Each state has its own constitution, grounded in republican principles, and government, consisting of three branches: executive, legislative, and judicial. Also, due to the shared sovereignty between each state and the federal government, Americans are citizens of both the federal republic and of the state in which they reside.

The governor heads the government's executive branch in each state or territory and, depending on the individual jurisdiction, may have considerable control over government budgeting, the power of appointment of many officials (including many judges), and a considerable role in legislation. The governor may also have additional roles, such as that of commander-in-chief of the state's National Guard (when not federalized) and of that state's respective defense force (which is not subject to federalization). In many states and territories the governor also has partial or absolute power to commute or pardon a criminal sentence. All U.S. governors serve four-year terms except those in New Hampshire and Vermont, who serve two-year terms.

In all states, the governor is directly elected, and in most cases has considerable practical powers, though this may be moderated by the state legislature and in some cases by other elected executive officials. In the five extant U.S. territories, all governors are now directly elected as well, though in the past many territorial governors were historically appointed by the President of the United States. Governors can veto state bills, and in all but seven states they have the power of the line-item veto on appropriations bills (a power the President does not have). In some cases legislatures can override a gubernatorial veto by a two-thirds vote, in others by three-fifths.

In Alabama, Indiana, Kentucky, and Tennessee, the governor's veto can be overridden by a simple majority vote.  In Arkansas, a gubernatorial veto may be overridden by an absolute majority. The governor of North Carolina had no veto power until a 1996 referendum. In 47 of the 50 states, whenever there is a vacancy of one of the state's U.S. Senate seats, that state's governor has the power to appoint someone to fill the vacancy until a special election is held; the governors of Oregon, Alaska, and Wisconsin do not have this power.

A state governor may give an annual State of the State address in order to satisfy a constitutional stipulation that a governor must report annually (or in older constitutions described as being "from time to time") on the state or condition of the state. Governors of states may also perform ceremonial roles, such as greeting dignitaries, conferring state decorations, issuing symbolic proclamations or attending the state fair. The governor may also have an official residence (see Governor's Mansion).

In a ranking of the power of the governorship in all 50 states, University of North Carolina political scientist Thad Beyle makes the distinction between "personal powers" of governors, which are factors that vary from person to person, season to season - and the "institutional powers" that are set in place by law. Examples of measurable personal factors are how large a governor's margin of victory was on election day, and standing in public opinion polls. Whether a governor has strong budget controls, appointment authority, and veto powers are examples of institutional powers.

History

In colonial North America, governors were chosen in a variety of ways, depending on how the colony was organized.  In the crown colonies of Great Britain, France, and Spain, the governor was chosen by the ruling monarch of the colonizing power, or his designees; in British colonies, the Board of Trade was often the primary decision maker.  Colonies based on a corporate charter, such as the Connecticut Colony and the Massachusetts Bay Colony, elected their own governors based on rules spelled out in the charter or other colonial legislation.  In proprietary colonies, such as the Province of Carolina before it became a crown colony (and was divided into North and South), governors were chosen by the Lords Proprietor who controlled the colony.  In the early years of the American Revolutionary War, eleven of the Thirteen Colonies evicted (with varying levels of violence) royal and proprietary governors. The other two colonies (Connecticut and Rhode Island) had corporate charters; Connecticut Governor Jonathan Trumbull was governor before and during the war period, while in Rhode Island, Governor Joseph Wanton was removed from office in 1775 for failing to support the rebel war effort.

Before achieving statehood, many of the 50 states were territories or parts of territories. Administered by the federal government, they had governors who were appointed by the president and confirmed by the Senate rather than elected by the resident population.  Election of territorial governors began in Puerto Rico in 1948.  The last appointed territorial governor, Hyrum Rex Lee in American Samoa, left office in 1978.

Demographics

Party

As of January 2023, there are 26 states with a Republican governor and 24 states with a Democratic governor. Four Democrats (including the Mayor of the District of Columbia), one Independent, and one New Progressive also occupy territorial governorships or mayorships. No independent and other third parties currently hold a state governorship.

Tenure

For each term, governors serve four years in office. The exceptions are Vermont and New Hampshire where tenures are two years long.

The longest-serving current governor is Jay Inslee of Washington, who was re-elected to his third term in 2020.

The longest-serving governor of all time was Terry Branstad of Iowa, who was elected to his sixth (non-consecutive) term in 2014. Governor Branstad resigned on May 24, 2017, to become the United States Ambassador to China. He held the title of Governor of Iowa for 22 years. On December 14, 2015, he became the longest-serving governor in US history, breaking the record held by George Clinton of New York, who served 21 years from 1777 to 1795 and from 1801 to 1804.

In the majority of the states and territories, term limit laws cap a governor's tenure.

Age

The youngest person to ever serve as a governor in the United States was Stevens T. Mason of the Michigan Territory, first elected in 1835 having just turned 24. Mason would later become the first governor of the state of Michigan when it was admitted to the Union in January 1837, when he was 25. Mason was re-elected in November 1837, then age 26.

The second youngest governor ever elected was Henry C. Warmoth of Louisiana, who was elected during reconstruction in 1868 at the age of 26. The third youngest governor was William Sprague IV of Rhode Island, who was elected in 1860 at the age of 29. When future President Bill Clinton was elected Governor of Arkansas in 1978 at age 32, he became the youngest governor since Harold Stassen of Minnesota, elected in 1938 at age 31.

In 35 states, the minimum age requirement of the governor is 30, though in some it is 25 (7), 21 (1), or 18 (5). Oklahoma is the only state with an older age, 31. Some states require the governor to be a qualified elector/voter, implying a minimum age of 18. Vermont requires candidates to be residents of the state for at least four years as of Election Day, which would preclude small children from running, but has no other implicit or explicit age limit.

Gender

As of January 2023, there are 38 male state governors and 12 female governors: Kay Ivey of Alabama, Katie Hobbs of Arizona, Sarah Huckabee Sanders of Arkansas, Kim Reynolds of Iowa, Laura Kelly of Kansas, Janet Mills of Maine, Maura Healey of Massachusetts, Gretchen Whitmer of Michigan, Michelle Lujan Grisham of New Mexico, Kathy Hochul of New York, Tina Kotek of Oregon, and Kristi Noem of South Dakota. Of those, Ivey, Huckabee Sanders, Noem, and Reynolds are Republicans, while Hobbs, Kelly, Mills, Healey, Whitmer, Grisham, Hochul, and Kotek are Democrats.

Four territorial governors are male; one territorial governor and the mayor of Washington, D.C. are female.

Forty-three women have served or are currently serving as state or territorial governors, including two in an acting capacity.

The first female governor was Nellie Tayloe Ross of Wyoming (widow of the late Wyoming Governor William B. Ross) who was elected on November 4, 1924, and sworn in on January 5, 1925, succeeding Frank Lucas. Also elected on November 4, 1924, was Miriam A. Ferguson of Texas (wife of former Texas Governor James E. Ferguson), succeeding  Pat Morris Neff on January 21, 1925. The first female governor elected without being the wife or widow of a past state governor was Ella T. Grasso of Connecticut, elected in 1974 and sworn in on January 8, 1975.

Connecticut, Arizona, and New Mexico are the only three states to have elected female governors from both major parties. New Hampshire has also had female governors from two parties, but Republican Vesta M. Roy served only in the acting capacity for a short time. Arizona was the first state where a woman followed another woman as governor (they were from different parties). Arizona also has had the most female governors with a total of five, and is the first state to have three women in a row serve as governor.  Washington was the first state to have both a female governor and female U.S. Senators serving at the same time (Christine Gregoire; Patty Murray; Maria Cantwell, respectively), from 2005 to 2013. New Hampshire was the first and currently only state to have a female governor and entirely female Congressional delegation serving at the same time, from 2013  to 2015.

Twelve women have been serving as chief executive of their states since January 10, 2023, when Sarah Huckabee Sanders was inaugurated as the first female governor of Arkansas. This beats the record of eleven set just days earlier following Maura Healey's inauguration as Governor of Massachusetts on January 5, 2023.

LGBT status
There are currently three governors who identify as LGBT: Jared Polis of Colorado, who identifies as gay, and Tina Kotek of Oregon and Maura Healey of Massachusetts, who identify as lesbian.

Race and ethnicity

Ethnic minorities as defined by the United States Census currently constitute 38.9% of the total population of the U.S. as of 2018.  There are currently 46 state governors who are non-Hispanic whites of European American background. There are 4 minority governors: Wes Moore of Maryland, who is black, Michelle Lujan Grisham of New Mexico, who is of Hispanic descent; Chris Sununu of New Hampshire, who is of Lebanese, Palestinian, Latin American, Irish and British descent; and Kevin Stitt of Oklahoma, who is a member of the Cherokee Nation. Sununu and Stitt are Republicans, while Grisham and Moore are Democrats.

Among the five U.S. territories, one Hispanic (Pedro Pierluisi of Puerto Rico), one Black (Albert Bryan of the U.S. Virgin Islands), and three Pacific Islander Americans (Lou Leon Guerrero of Guam, Lemanu Peleti Mauga of American Samoa, and Arnold Palacios of the Northern Mariana Islands) currently serve as governor. African-American Muriel Bowser is the current Mayor of the District of Columbia, an office equivalent to a governor.

In 1990, Douglas Wilder of Virginia became the first African-American governor of any state since the Reconstruction era.

Birthplace
Fourteen of the current state governors were born outside the state they are serving: Mike Dunleavy of Alaska (born in Pennsylvania), Ned Lamont of Connecticut (born in Washington, D.C.), Josh Green of Hawaii (born in New York), J. B. Pritzker of Illinois (born in California), Laura Kelly of Kansas (born in New York), Larry Hogan of Maryland (born in Washington, D.C.), Maura Healey of Massachusetts (born in Maryland), Tim Walz of Minnesota (born in Nebraska), Greg Gianforte of Montana (born in California), Joe Lombardo of Nevada (born in Japan), Phil Murphy of New Jersey (born in Massachusetts), Kevin Stitt of Oklahoma (born in Florida), Tina Kotek of Oregon (born in Pennsylvania), and Mark Gordon of Wyoming (born in New York).

State constitutions have varying requirements for the length of citizenship and residency of the governor but unlike the President, state governors do not need to be natural-born citizens. There is some ambiguity in some state constitutions if a governor must be a citizen or just a resident.

Physical disability
Two legally blind governors have served: Bob C. Riley, who was acting governor of Arkansas for eleven days in January 1975, and David Paterson, who was governor of New York from 2008 until 2010.

The current governor of Texas, Greg Abbott, has been paraplegic since an accident in 1984; he has used a wheelchair ever since. Governor of New York Franklin D. Roosevelt was paraplegic; he later became the first wheelchair-using president. Governor of Alabama George Wallace was paralyzed from the waist down after being shot in 1972. He never walked again.

Salary
The average salary of a state governor in 2009 was $124,398. The highest salary currently being accepted is that of New York Governor Kathy Hochul at $225,000. The lowest salaries are those of Maine Governor Janet Mills  and Pedro Pierluisi of Puerto Rico at $70,000 each.

There have been several instances where the governor of a state has either refused their salary in its entirety or instead only taken $1.00 per year. Alabama Governor Robert J. Bentley refused his yearly salary of $119,950.00 until the state reached full employment. Michigan Governor Rick Snyder took a $1.00 yearly salary. Texas Governor Greg Abbott has returned his salary to the state during each year he has held office. During his tenure as Governor of California, Arnold Schwarzenegger also did not accept his salary of $170,000 per year. However, several governors instead have decided to take a reduction in their salary instead of refusing it entirely. New York Governor Andrew Cuomo took a 5 percent reduction in his salary in 2015, and Kentucky Governor Steve Beshear reduced his salary by 10 percent during the same year.

Only eight states (Massachusetts, California, Illinois, New York, New Jersey, Michigan, Pennsylvania and Virginia) currently offer their governors a higher salary than the $174,000 paid to members of Congress. In many states, the governor is not the highest-paid state employee; most often, that distinction is held by the head football or men's basketball coach at a major state university.

Gubernatorial election timeline
All states except Louisiana hold gubernatorial elections on the first Tuesday following the first Monday in November. The earliest possible date for the election is therefore November 2 (if that date falls on a Tuesday), and the latest possible date is November 8 (if November 1 falls on a Tuesday). Louisiana holds its gubernatorial primary on the third or fourth Saturday of October and the general election (commonly referred to as the runoff within the state) on the third Saturday of November,  but the general election is cancelled if one candidate wins the primary outright (see primary section below).
 Two states hold their gubernatorial elections every even numbered year. Recent years are 2012, 2014, 2016, 2018, 2020 and 2022.
New Hampshire and Vermont

The other 48 states hold gubernatorial elections every four years.
 Thirty-four states and three territories hold their gubernatorial elections during a midterm election year. Washington D.C. also holds their mayoral election during a midterm election year. Recent years are 2006, 2010, 2014, 2018 and 2022.
Alabama, Alaska, Arizona, Arkansas, California, Colorado, Connecticut, Florida, Georgia, Hawaii, Idaho, Illinois, Iowa, Kansas, Maine, Maryland, Massachusetts, Michigan, Minnesota, Nebraska, Nevada, New Mexico, New York, Ohio, Oklahoma, Oregon, Pennsylvania, Rhode Island, South Carolina, South Dakota, Tennessee, Texas, Wisconsin, Wyoming, Guam, Northern Mariana Islands, the Virgin Islands, and Washington DC.
 Nine states and two territories hold their gubernatorial elections during a presidential election year (although Puerto Rico and American Samoa do not hold an election for president). Recent years are 2004, 2008, 2012, 2016, and 2020.
Delaware, Indiana, Missouri, Montana, North Carolina, North Dakota, Utah, Washington, West Virginia, American Samoa, and Puerto Rico.
 Three states hold their gubernatorial elections the year before a presidential election year. Recent years are 2007, 2011, 2015, and 2019.
Kentucky, Louisiana, and Mississippi
 Two states hold their gubernatorial elections the year after a presidential election year. Recent years are 2005, 2009, 2013, 2017, and 2021.
New Jersey and Virginia

Gubernatorial primaries
All states except for California, Louisiana, and Washington hold primaries in which each political party holds a primary election, and the winner of the primary election moves on to compete in a general election. In California, Louisiana, and Washington, all the candidates run in a blanket primary against each other. Regardless of political party, the top two candidates move on to the general election. In Louisiana, the general election occurs between the top two candidates if no candidate obtains more than 50% of the votes cast, and is cancelled if one of the candidates receives more than 50%. In California and Washington, the top two vote getters proceed to the general election regardless of how many votes the top vote getter received in the primary, and California prohibits write-in candidates from competing in the general election.

Comparison with other U.S. general elections

Term limits
In most states, governors can serve two four-year terms.

Relationship with lieutenant governor
The type of relationship between the governor and the lieutenant governor greatly varies by state. In some states the governor and lieutenant governor are completely independent of each other, while in others the governor gets to choose (prior to the election) who would be their lieutenant governor.
 Five states do not have a lieutenant governor. In those states, a different constitutional officer assumes the office of the governor should there be a vacancy in the office. Those states are Arizona, Oregon and Wyoming where the Secretary of State is next in line, and Maine and New Hampshire, where the President of the Senate is next in line. Arizona is expected to elect its first lieutenant governor in 2026, following a successful ballot initiative in 2022.
 Seventeen states have separate elections for the governor and the lieutenant governor, which may lead to the governor and the lieutenant governor being from different parties. Those states are Alabama, Arkansas, California, Delaware, Georgia, Idaho, Louisiana, Mississippi, Missouri, Nevada, North Carolina, Oklahoma, Rhode Island, Texas, Vermont, Virginia, and Washington.
 Two states have the State Senate appoint the lieutenant governor, which may mean that the governor and the lieutenant governor may be from different parties. Those states are Tennessee and West Virginia.
 Eight states have the governor and lieutenant governor run together on the same ticket, but the governor does not get to choose their running mate. In those states, the primaries for governor and lieutenant governor are held separately, and the winners run together as a joint ticket in the general election. The governor and lieutenant governor would therefore be from the same party, but not necessarily political allies. Those states are Alaska, Connecticut, Hawaii, Massachusetts, New Mexico, New York, Pennsylvania, and Wisconsin.
 Eighteen states have the governor and lieutenant governor run together on the same ticket similar to the President and Vice President of the United States, where a candidate for governor selects a would-be lieutenant governor. Illinois, Kansas, Kentucky, Maryland, Minnesota, North Dakota, Ohio, and Utah have gubernatorial candidates pick their running mates before the primaries, while in Colorado, Florida, Indiana, Iowa, Michigan, Montana, Nebraska, New Jersey, South Carolina, and South Dakota, the running mate is chosen after the primary. The latter system allows the nominee to potentially select a defeated primary competitor.

Constitutional gubernatorial qualifications by state

With the notable exception of Kansas, each of the states specifies in its constitution its qualifications for Governor.

See also
 The flags and seals of governors of the U.S. states
 Governor and lieutenant governor (non-U.S.)
 List of U.S. state governors born outside the United States
 Mexican state governors
 Premier (Australia)  similar position of states/territorial government in Australia
 Premier (Canada)  similar position of provincial/territorial government in Canada

Footnotes

References

External links

The Green Papers: Constitutions of the states
The Green Papers: State constitutions, an explanation
The Green Papers: Links to state constitutions
Citings of Religious Influence in First State Constitutions
 Rutgers Program on the Governor

Government occupations
Gubernatorial titles
State government in the United States